Siek is a municipality in the district of Stormarn in Schleswig-Holstein, Germany.

Siek is the seat of the Amt ("collective municipality") Siek.

References

Stormarn (district)